Mesa del Cobre is a town in the municipality of San Martín de Hidalgo in the Mexican state of  Jalisco, approximately 2 hours southwest of Guadalajara.

Toponymics
The official name of Mesa del Cobre (meaning “The Copper Mesa” ) comes from its copper-orange colored soil. The town sits on top of a mesa, hence the name Mesa del Cobre. The nearest communities to Mesa del Cobre are El Cobre and Lagunillas, which reside 2 kilometers to the east.
The population of Mesa del Cobre is about 50 as of 2005.  The city was founded in 1890 by land settlers in nearby cities looking for farm land. The town used to be a forest until it was settled in 1890.

Economy
Most of its economy depends on agriculture. 90% of it is the export of agave  for the production of tequila, sábila and corn.

Tourism
The Cerro El Huehuentón (8399 ft.) is the highest elevated point in the Sierra de Quila that surrounds the town and is visited by more than 500 people a year.

External links
http://mexico.pueblosamerica.com/i/mesa-del-cobre/
https://web.archive.org/web/20110617085747/http://www.e-local.gob.mx/work/templates/enciclo/jalisco/

Populated places in Jalisco